Sezgin Tanrıkulu is a Turkish human rights lawyer known for his defense of the rights of Kurdish citizens. He is currently serving as an MP in the Turkish Grand Assembly with the Republican People's Party (CHP).

Early life and education 
Tanrıkulu is from Diyarbakır, Turkey. He attended law school in Istanbul, graduating in 1984. When he returned to Diyarbakır, he found it under emergency rule by the Turkish government and its mayor Mehdi Zana, husband of politician Leyla Zana, charged with separatism. Tanrıkulu became involved in Zana's case and soon became a full-time human rights lawyer.

Professional career 
He is the co-founder of the Diyarbakır Human Rights Association and the representative of the Human Rights Foundation of Turkey. He advised the people how to file a case at the European Court of Human Rights. He was indicted several times for his legal activities. In 1994, he was charged with  "insulting the judiciary" after he appealed a conviction that had relied on a statement extracted by torture. From 1990 to 1995, six of his friends and colleagues were murdered for their work on human rights cases. He was the President of the Diyarbakır Bar Association from 2002 to 2008.

Political career 
Sezgin Tanrikulu joined the Republican People's Party (CHP) in 2010, becoming the CHP director of Human Rights and was elected a member of the Grand National Assembly of Turkey in 2011.  He was re-elected each time and currently is still a member of parliament. In parliament he defended the minority rights and the human rights of the prisoners. He is also defender of the press freedom in Turkey, and released a report which criticized the closing down of media outlets and the imprisonment of journalists. He opposed the arrest of the academics for peace who signed a petition urging for a peaceful solution of the Kurdish-Turkish conflict in 2016. In September 2020, it was reported that Tanrıkulu was appointed the advisor to party chairman Kemal Kılicdaroğlu.

Prosecution 
An investigation was launched for degrading the Turkish Republic for his remarks where he made public his opposition towards the Turkish military operation into Syria in October 2019.

On 25 April 2022, Ankara Chief Public Prosecutor’s Office opened an investigation on Tanrıkulu over "insulting Turkishness" after he called for remembrance of hundreds of Armenian intellectuals that were forcibly disappeared on 24 April, the Armenian genocide remembrance day.

Awards 
In 1997, he received the Robert F. Kennedy Human Rights Award along with fellow attorney Senal Sarihan. This is an award given each year to an individual whose courageous activism is at the heart of the human rights movement and in the spirit of Robert F. Kennedy's vision and legacy.

References

External links
https://twitter.com/MSTanrikulu

Living people
People from Diyarbakır
20th-century Turkish lawyers
Turkish human rights activists
Year of birth missing (living people)
Members of the 25th Parliament of Turkey
Members of the 24th Parliament of Turkey
Members of the 26th Parliament of Turkey
Istanbul University Faculty of Law alumni
Robert F. Kennedy Human Rights Award laureates
21st-century Turkish lawyers